The 138th Attack Squadron (138 ATKS) is a unit of the New York Air National Guard's 174th Attack Wing located at Hancock Field Air National Guard Base in Syracuse, New York. The 138th is equipped with the MQ-9 Reaper Remotely Piloted Aircraft (RPA).

History

World War II
Formed at Hunter Army Airfield, Georgia, as a Third Air Force Operational Training Unit (OTU), equipped with A-24 Banshee dive bombers. Moved to California in September 1943 as part of Desert Training Center in Mojave Desert.

After the A-24 was taken out of combat service, trained with P-39 Airacobras and became combat ready, being reassigned to VIII Fighter Command in England, April 1944. Re-equipped with P-51 Mustangs, with a mission for escorting B-17 Flying Fortress and B-24 Liberator heavy bombers during its first five weeks of operations, and afterwards flew many escort missions to cover the operations of medium and heavy bombers that struck strategic objectives, interdicted the enemy's communications, or supported operations on the ground.

The group frequently strafed airfields and other targets of opportunity while on escort missions. Provided fighter cover over the English Channel and the coast of Normandy during the invasion of France in June 1944. Strafed and dive-bombed vehicles, locomotives, marshalling yards, anti-aircraft batteries, and troops while Allied forces fought to break out of the beachhead in France. Attacked transportation targets as Allied armies drove across France after the breakthrough at Saint-Lô in July. Flew area patrols during the airborne attack on the Netherlands in September. Escorted bombers to, and flew patrols over the battle area during the German counterattack in the Ardennes (Battle of the Bulge), December 1944 – January 1945. Provided area patrols during the assault across the Rhine in March 1945.

Returned to the US in October and inactivated on 17 October 1945 as an administrative unit.

New York Air National Guard

The wartime 505th Fighter Squadron was re-designated as the 138th Fighter Squadron, and was allotted to the New York Air National Guard, on 24 May 1946. It was organized at Hancock Field, Syracuse, New York, and was extended federal recognition on 28 October 1947 by the National Guard Bureau. The 138th Fighter Squadron was bestowed the lineage, history, honors, and colors of the 505d Fighter Squadron and all predecessor units. It was the first New York Air National Guard squadron that was extended federal recognition.

The squadron was equipped with F-47D Thunderbolts and was assigned initially to the New York ANG 52d Fighter Wing, then in December 1948 to the 107th Fighter Group, operationally gained by Continental Air Command.

The mission of the 138th Fighter Squadron was the air defense of Central and Northern New York. Aircraft parts were no problem and many of the maintenance personnel were World War II veterans so readiness was quite high and the planes were often much better maintained than their USAF counterparts. In some ways, the postwar Air National Guard was almost like a flying country club and a pilot could often show up at the field, check out an aircraft and go flying. However, the unit also had regular military exercises that kept up proficiency and in gunnery and bombing contests they would often score at least as well or better than active-duty USAF units, given the fact that most ANG pilots were World War II combat veterans.

Air Defense mission 
In January 1950 the 138th became the first New York Air National Guard unit to receive jet aircraft, obtaining F-84B Thunderjets, mostly from the USAF 20th Fighter Group at Shaw AFB, South Carolina.

With the surprise invasion of South Korea on 25 June 1950, and the regular military's complete lack of readiness, most of the nation's Air National Guard was federalized and placed on active duty.  The 138th was retained by the State of New York to maintain the air defense mission.

In December 1950/January 1951 the 138th transferred several F-84Bs to the Arizona ANG 197th Fighter Squadron at Luke AFB, and at the end of 1951 the remainder were transferred to the federalized Michigan ANG 127th Pilot Training Group, also at Luke AFB.  The Thunderjets were used for jet pilot transition training for pilots being deployed to Korea.   In return, the 138th received Very Long Range F-51H Mustangs with were capable of extended air defense flights over all of New York state.  In 1952, the 138th became one of the first Air National Guard squadrons to commence standing daylight runway alert. At least two aircraft from the squadron with pilots in their cockpits stood alert at the end of runway from one hour before sunrise to one hour after sunset every day of the year.

The air defense mission remained after the Korean War armistice and the unit resumed normal peacetime training and drills. In 1954, the Mustang was ending its service life and Air Defense Command was re-equipping its fighter-interceptor squadrons with jet aircraft. The 138th received F-94B Starfires, however the F-94 required a two-man aircrew, a pilot and an air observer to operate its radar equipment. Trainees for the radar assignment had to attend regular Air Force training schools, and required virtually the same qualifications as the pilot trainees. The additional recruitment of guardsmen led to the units having a manning and capabilities problem that lasted for some time until the unit was returned to full readiness.

In 1956, the 107th Fighter-Interceptor Wing was reorganized and re-designated as the 107th Air Defense Wing.   The 107th Fighter-Interceptor Group was re-designated as the 107th Fighter Group (Air Defense) and transferred from Niagara Falls Municipal Airport to Hancock Field on 1 May, with the 138th FIS being assigned.  The F-86H Sabre replaced the F-94B Starfires in 1957.

Tactical Air Command
A major change to the 107th Air Defense Wing in 1958 was the transition from an Air Defense Commande (ADC) mission to Tactical Air Command (TAC) and a tactical fighter mission, the 107th being re-designated as a Tactical Fighter Group; and 138th also being re-designated. The new assignment involved a change in the Group's training mission to include high-altitude interception, air-to-ground rocketry, ground strafing and tactical bombing. The 138th TFS retained their F-86H Sabres.

1961 Berlin Federalization
During the summer of 1961, as the 1961 Berlin Crisis unfolded, the 138th TFS was notified on 16 August of its pending federalization and recall to active duty.  On 1 October the 138th was federalized and assigned to the Massachusetts ANG 102d Tactical Fighter Wing, which was federalized and placed on active duty at Otis Air Force Base.

The mission of the 102d TFW was to reinforce the United States Air Forces in Europe (USAFE) and deploy to Phalsbourg-Bourscheid Air Base, France. In France, the unit was to provide close air support to NATO ground forces and air interdiction.  This involved keeping its aircraft on 24/7 alert.  Between 28 and 30 October, the 102d TFW departed Otis AFB for Phalsbourg.  The wing deployed 82 F-86H Sabres. In addition 2 C-47 and 6 T-33 aircraft were assigned to the wing for support and training purposes.

Starting on 5 December, the 102d began deploying to Wheelus Air Base Libya for gunnery training.  During its time in Europe, the 102d participated in several USAF and NATO exercises, including a deployment to Leck Air Base, West Germany near the Danish border.  At Leck, ground and support crews from both countries exchanged duties, learning how to perform aircraft maintenance and operational support tasks.

On 7 May 1962, USAFE Seventeenth Air Force directed that the 102d TFW would deploy back to the United States during the summer, and the unit returned to the United States in July 1962.  Regular USAF personnel, along with a group of ANG personnel who volunteered to remain on active duty formed the 480th Tactical Fighter Squadron of the newly activated 366th Tactical Fighter Wing. The last of the ANG aircraft departing on 20 July.

Vietnam era
Upon its return to New York State Control, the 107th Tactical Fighter Group was transferred back to Niagara Falls, and the 138th TFS was authorized to expand to a group level.  The 174th Tactical Fighter Group was allocated and was federally recognized by the National Guard Bureau on 1 September 1962.  The 138th TFS became the group's flying squadron. Other squadrons assigned into the group were the 174th Headquarters, 174th Material Squadron (Maintenance), 174th Combat Support Squadron, and the 174th USAF Dispensary.

The squadron remained equipped with the F-86H and continued normal peacetime training and exercises. In the summer of 1965, the squadron took part in Exercise Oneida Bear II at Fort Drum, which involved some 6,500 soldiers of the regular Army, the Army Reserve and the National Guard.   138th TFS aircraft from Syracuse provided close air support to both Aggressor and Friendly Forces during the Exercise, and were engaged in realistic tactical air strikes. In the exercise, conducted by the First Army, the Second Brigade of the Army's Fifth Infantry was opposed by an aggressor force of selected Army National Guard and Army Reserve Units. The 174th Group's pilots flew 77 sorties for a total of 114 hours without a single abort.

The squadron trained at Ramey AFB, Puerto Rico, in early 1967 in an all service amphibious and airborne exercise. A detachment of unit pilots and support personnel participated (22 officers and 69 airmen). Twelve F-86H aircraft participated with three C-130 Hercules for equipment and personnel support. All types of tactical air missions were flown. Total sorties were 213 with total hours flown, 308. Special firepowers demonstration was accomplished with 20 sorties delivering 40 (750 lbs.) and 2000 rounds of 20mm fired.   Later in 1967 Operation Sentry Post I was held in August. This was a joint Air National Guard – TAC Exercise. Twelve F-86Hs were flown and squadron pilots worked with radar flying air-to-air and air-to-ground gunnery with and without FAC type missions. A total of 204 sorties and 245, hours were flown in this
operation.

In 1968, the 174th TFG was federalized and placed on active duty.  The Group was alerted for active duty on 11 April 1968, partially mobilized on 13 May and deployed to Cannon Air Force Base, Clovis, New Mexico.  The mission of the 174th was to train Forward Air Controllers (FAC) for service in Vietnam. The FAC flew a light observation aircraft at low altitudes, visually observing enemy installations and movements and providing on-the-spot directions for fighters and bombers. The FAC dictated the type of ordnance to be delivered, observes the strike, and evaluates its effectiveness. The mission of the 174th was to give FAC's in training actual experience in fighter aircraft so that they would be fully apprised of the requirements of the men they would be directing in combat in South Vietnam.

On arrival at Cannon AFB along with the Maryland ANG 175th Tactical Fighter Group, they comprised the 140th Tactical Fighter Wing. Originally based in Denver, Colorado, headquarters of the 140th moved to Cannon AFB with the deployment of the 140th Tactical Fighter Group to active duty in Vietnam. Not all members of the 174th Tactical Fighter Group were mobilized, however. Subsequent to the alert notice, a change directed mobilization of only the Group Headquarters, the 138th Tactical Fighter Squadron, and the 174th Consolidated Aircraft Maintenance Squadron. The remaining members of the 174th remained in Syracuse on a drill status during the eight months of mobilized service. The unit was inactivated on 20 December 1968, and all members reverted to Air National Guard drill status.

Close Air Support

During 1970, the 174th began retiring its F-86H Sabres after over a decade of service, the 138th Tactical Fighter Squadron flying the last USAF/ANG Sabre sortie on 30 September.   Replacing the Sabre was the Cessna A-37B Dragonfly and a newly conceived close air support tactical fighter mission in a ground insurgency environment which were gained by combat experience in Vietnam.

After a decade of routine peacetime exercises and training with the A-37, in 1979 the 174th began a transition to the A-10A Thunderbolt II Close Air Support fighter.  With the arrival of the A-10, the 174th was changed in status from a Group to a Wing on 1 July 1979.   The wing was one of three Air National Guard units equipped with the A-10 as part of the "Total Force" concept which equipped ANG units with front-line USAF aircraft.  In 1980, after the transition to the A-10 was completed, the 138th TFS was deployed to Savannah Air National Guard Base, Georgia. On arrival, the unit was given sealed orders directing them to a remote, forward operational location and operate combat sorties, fully loaded with live ordnance. Not only was the 174th's combat readiness put to the optimum peacetime test, but the unit's mobility was tested to the fullest.  In response, an additional six A-10s were assigned to it, making the 138th TFS the Air National Guard's only "super" squadron, with 24 aircraft.

With the transition complete, the unit deployed eight A-10 aircraft from Syracuse, non-stop to a forward operation location in West Germany. In exercise Cornet Sail, the 138th demonstrated for the first time the ability of an Air National Guard or Air Force Reserve unit to deploy this advanced aircraft in this manner.  Combat readiness in West Germany was achieved 12 hours after departing Hancock Field.

With the move of the USAF 21st Air Division to Griffiss AFB in 1984, the 174th TFW became the host unit at Hancock Field.  Later that year, the unit deployed to Exercise Air Warrior at the National Training Center, Fort Irwin, California; a three-week deployment to Lechfeld Air Base, West Germany and with the NY ANG 107th Fighter-Interceptor Group at Goose Air Base, Labrador.

The 174th also was among the first A-10 close support aircraft organizations to provide temporary tactical air defense support from Howard Air Force Base, Panama when the unit deployed to Howard in March 1985 when runway construction precluded the use of the A-7D Corsair IIs that normally fulfilled the tactical air defense duties of the Panama Canal.  Shortly afterward, it deployed to Alaska for the first time.  The 138th TFS completed the 2,700-mile flight to Eielson AFB without external navigation aids.

As in past years, continuing NATO deployments to West Germany in the late 1980s saw the 174th TFW personnel training and living side-by-side with their West German Air Force counterparts as they would in a combat situation.  The 174th began 1988 on a high note when the Air Force announced the wing would convert from the A-10 to the specialized Block 10 F-16A/B Fighting Falcone, also referred to as the F/A-16 due to its close air support configuration.   With the Block 10 F-16, the 174th became the first Air Force organization to fly the Fighting Falcon with a Close Air Support mission.

The first F-16 aircraft started arriving in late 1988. These aircraft were passed down from regular USAF units who were upgrading to the F-16C/D model. During 1989 the 138th TFS was chosen as a test unit for a close air support version of the F-16. The aircraft were the only F-16s ever to be equipped with this weapon, intended for use against a variety of battlefield targets, including armor with the 30 mm gun pod. The unit received the USAF's Outstanding Maintenance Squadron Award that year.

Operation Desert Storm
In 1991, the 138th TFS deployed to the Persian Gulf with 516 members in support of Operation Desert Storm. The 138th was one of only two Air National Guard units to fly combat missions during Operation Desert Storm. The Close Air Support project however proved to be a miserable failure. Precision aiming was impossible for several reasons: the pylon mount wasn't as steady as the A-10's rigid mounting; the F-16 flies much faster than an A-10, giving the pilots too little time approaching the target; firing the gun shook the aircraft harshly and made it impossible to control the targeting; the essential CCIP (constantly computed impact point) software was unavailable. The pilots ended up using the gun as an area effect weapon, spraying multiple targets with ammunition, producing an effect rather like a cluster bomb. It took only a couple of days of this before they gave up, unbolted the gun pods, and went back to dropping real cluster bombs – which did the job more effectively.

The unit received the Air Force Outstanding Unit Award, with the "V" device for valor, during Operation Desert Storm; the Air Force Association Outstanding Unit Award; and the National Guard Association's Best Family Support Center Award.

Air Combat Command
 
In March 1992, with the end of the Cold War, the 174th adopted the Air Force Objective Organization plan, and the unit was re-designated as the 174th Fighter Wing. With the organization change, the 138th Fighter Squadron was assigned to the new 174th Operations Group.   In June, Tactical Air Command was inactivated as part of the Air Force reorganization after the end of the Cold War.  It was replaced by Air Combat Command (ACC).

In 1993 the 174th FW started trading in their old Block 10 F-16 A/B models for newer Block 30 F-16C/D aircraft configured for Tactical Air Support.  In that process the squadron had the 'honor' of sending the first F-16 to AMARC storage.  This happened on 20 July 1993, when an F-16A (#79-0340) was flown to Davis-Monthan AFB, Arizona for flyable storage. Although these aircraft were only 13 years old, they were put into storage due to more modern models becoming available and Block 10 wasn't needed any longer by the USAF. The general mission for the squadron remained unchanged with this transition.

Also in 1993, the 138th TFS became the first US unit to have a female F-16 fighter pilot, Jackie Parker, in 1993 immediately after combat roles were opened to females.

In June 1995, the unit deployed for 30 days rotation to Incirlik Air Base, Turkey as part of Operation Provide Comfort, assisting in the enforcement the No Fly Zone over Northern Iraq.

In mid-1996, the Air Force, in response to budget cuts, and changing world situations, began experimenting with Air Expeditionary organizations. The Air Expeditionary Force (AEF) concept was developed that would mix Active-Duty, Reserve and Air National Guard elements into a combined force. Instead of entire permanent units deploying as "Provisional" as in the 1991 Gulf War, Expeditionary units are composed of "aviation packages" from several wings, including active-duty Air Force, the Air Force Reserve Command and the Air National Guard, would be married together to carry out the assigned deployment rotation.

The 138th Expeditionary Fighter Squadron (138th EFS) was first formed and deployed in August 1996 for Operation Northern Watch (ONW).  ONW was a US European Command Combined Task Force (CTF) who was responsible for enforcing the United Nations mandated no-fly zone above the 36th parallel in Iraq. This mission was a successor to Operation Provide Comfort which also entailed support for the Iraqi Kurds.

In 1997, the 138th Fighter Squadron commemorated its 50th Anniversary in conjunction with the United States Air Force by hosting the United States Air Force Thunderbirds aerobatics team at the Syracuse Air Show.

During 1996–97, the 174th FW deployed to Andøya Air Station, Norway as part of the "Adventure Express 97" NATO exercise. In 1998, the 174th FW deployed to Tyndall AFB, Florida, for the "Combat Archer" exercise and also to the Dugway Proving Ground, Utah, to participate in exercise "Global Patriot 98".

Only six years later, in 1999, the 138th FS changed block types once more, sending its Block 30s to the Illinois ANG 170th Fighter Squadron and receiving older block 25 F-16s from the Texas ANG 182d Fighter Squadron. This meant changing again from the General Electric engine to the Pratt & Whitney.

An AEF deployment to Prince Sultan Air Base, Saudi Arabia resulted in the formation of the 138th EFS in early 2000. Operation Southern Watch was an operation which was responsible for enforcing the United Nations mandated no-fly zone below the 32d parallel in Iraq.  This mission was initiated mainly to cover for attacks of Iraqi forces on the Iraqi Shi’ite Muslims. The squadron returned to the Block 30 Aircraft in 2004, receiving aircraft from the 50th TFW at Spangdahlem Air Base, Germany shifting from engine type once more.

As part of the Global War on Terrorism, the 138th EFS deployed twice to Balad Air Base, Iraq in 2006 and 2008

MQ-9 Reaper and Attack Mission

In 2008 it became apparent that the 138th FS was going jump into the future of combat aviation and that Hancock ANGB would begin a new chapter. The squadron was set to fly the MQ-9 Reaper. The unit's transition from flying legacy aircraft to Reapers was more than a tactical shift. It assured the future of the base at Hancock Field.  In October 2009, the 174th Fighter Wing cut the ribbon on its new MQ-9 Reaper maintenance school, where it trains technicians from across the country, from all military branches.

On 6 March 2010, the last two F-16s (#85-1561 and #85-1570) departed Hancock Field marking the end of F-16 operations at the base. They made three low passes for the assembled crowd gathered to commemorate the past of aviation at the Syracuse ANG base in upstate New York.

In 2020, the 138th Attack Squadron reached 60,000 hours of MQ-9 flight time. That is the equivalent of 20,000 or 30,000 sorties conducted by conventional manned fighters. The 138th Attack Squadron commander called the achievement “a really significant milestone. It’s literally 2,500 days of keeping an aircraft in the air, watching our enemies, protecting our allies, and keeping America safe.”

In 2022, the 138th Attack Squadron won the coveted Reaper Smoke exercise. Testing remotely piloted aircraft pilots and sensor operators, exercise Reaper Smoke 2022 pitted dozens of aircrews against each other from more than 35 separate squadrons for the chance to be known throughout the RPA community as simply: the best.

Lineage

 Constituted 484th Bombardment Squadron (Dive) on 3 August 1942
 Activated on 10 August 1942
 Re-designated: 505th Fighter-Bomber Squadron on 10 August 1943
 Re-designated: 505th Fighter Squadron on 30 May 1944
 Inactivated on 17 October 1945
 Re-designated: 138th Fighter Squadron, and allotted to New York ANG, on 24 May 1946.
 Received federal recognition and activated on 28 October 1947
 Re-designated: 138th Fighter-Interceptor Squadron, 1 December 1952
 Re-designated: 138th Tactical Fighter Squadron, 10 November 1958
 Federalized and placed on active duty, 1 October 1961
 Released from active duty and returned to New York state control, 31 August 1962
 Federalized and placed on active duty, 11 April 1968
 Released from active duty and returned to New York state control, 20 December 1968
 Federalized and placed on active duty, 20 November 1990
 Released from active duty and returned to New York state control, 31 March 1991
 Re-designated: 138th Fighter Squadron, 16 March 1992
 Components designated as: 138th Expeditionary Fighter Squadron when deployed as part of an Air and Space Expeditionary unit after June 1996.
 Re-designated: 138th Attack Squadron, 9 September 2012

Assignments
 339th Bombardment (later Fighter-Bomber; Fighter) Group, 10 Aug 1942 – 17 Oct 1945.
 52d Fighter Wing, 28 October 1947
 107th Fighter Group, 8 December 1948
 107th Fighter-Interceptor Group, 1 December 1952
 107th Fighter Group (Air Defense), 1 May 1956
 107th Tactical Fighter Group, 10 November 1958
 102d Tactical Fighter Wing, 1 October 1961
 174th Tactical Fighter Group, 1 September 1962
 140th Tactical Fighter Wing, 11 April 1968
 174th Tactical Fighter Group, 20 December 1968
 174th Tactical Fighter Wing, 1 July 1979
 Elements attached to: 4th Tactical Fighter Wing (Provisional), 20 November 1990 – 31 March 1991
 174th Operations Group, 16 March 1992 – Present

Stations

 Hunter Field, Georgia, 10 August 1942
 Drew Field, Florida, February 1943
 Walterboro Army Airfield, South Carolina, July 1943
 Rice Army Airfield, California, 1 September 1943— March 1944
 RAF Fowlmere (AAF-378), England, 4 April 1944— October 1945
 Camp Myles Standish, Massachusetts, 16–17 Oct 1945
 Hancock Field, Syracuse, New York, 28 October 1947
 Designated: Hancock Field Air National Guard Base, 1991–Present

New York Air National Guard Deployments

 1961 Berlin Crisis federalization
 Elements operated from: Phalsbourg-Bourscheid Air Base, France, 1 October 1961 – 31 August 1962
 Vietnam War federalization
 Operated from: Cannon Air Force Base, New Mexico, 13 May 1968 – 20 December 1969
 1990/1991 Gulf Crisis federalization
 Operated from: Prince Sultan Air Base, Al Kharj, Saudi Arabia, November 1990 – March 1991
 Operation Provide Comfort II
 Operated from: Incirlik Air Base, Turkey, May–September 1995

 Operation Northern Watch (AEF)
 Operated from: Incirlik Air Base, Turkey, August–November 1996
 Operation Southern Watch (AEF)
 Operated from: Prince Sultan Air Base, Al Kharj, Saudi Arabia, February–April 2000
 Operation Iraqi Freedom (AEF)
 Operated from: Balad Air Base, Iraq, September–December 2006
 Operated from: Balad Air Base, Iraq, June–August 2008
 Operation Enduring Freedom (AEF)
 Operated From: Bagram Airfield, Afghanistan, July 2010 – January 2011 (MQ-9)

Aircraft

 A-24 Banshee, 1942–1943
 P-39 Airacobra, 1943–1944
 P-51 Mustang, 1944–1945
 F-47D Thunderbolt, 1947–1950
 F-84B Thunderjet, 1950–1951
 F-51H Mustang, 1951–1954
 F-94B Starfire, 1954–1957

 F-86H Sabre, 1957–1970
 A-37B Dragonfly, 1970–1979
 A-10A Thunderbolt II, 1979–1989
 F-16A Fighting Falcon (F/A-16), 1989–1993
 F-16C Fighting Falcon, 1993–2010
 MQ-9 Reaper, 2010–Present

References

 Combat Squadrons of the Air Force: World War II. Maxwell Air Force Base, Alabama: Office of Air Force History, 1982.
 Rogers, B. (2006). United States Air Force Unit Designations Since 1978. 
 New York Department of Military Affairs Adjutant General Reports, 1846–1988
 174th Fighter Wing @syracuse.com
 McLaren, David. Republic F-84 Thunderjet, Thunderstreak & Thunderflash: A Photo Chronicle. Atglen, PA: Schiffer Military/Aviation History, 1998. .

External links

Squadrons of the United States Air National Guard
Military units and formations in New York (state)
Attack squadrons of the United States Air Force